The W. Wallace McDowell Award is awarded by the IEEE Computer Society for outstanding theoretical, design, educational, practical, or related innovative contributions that fall within the scope of Computer Society interest. This is the highest technical award made solely by the IEEE Computer Society where selection of the awardee is based on the "highest level of technical accomplishment and achievement". The IEEE Computer Society (with over 85000 members from every field of computing) is "dedicated to advancing the theory, practice, and application of computer and information processing technology." Another award considered to be the "most prestigious technical award in computing" is the A. M. Turing Award awarded by Association for Computing Machinery (ACM).  This is popularly referred to as the "computer science's equivalent of the Nobel Prize". The W. Wallace McDowell Award is sometimes popularly referred to as the "IT Nobel".

The award is named after W. Wallace McDowell who was director of engineering at IBM, during the development of the landmark product IBM 701.  Mr. McDowell was responsible for the transition from electro-mechanical techniques to electronics, and the subsequent transition to solid state devices.

The first recipient, in 1966, was Fernando J. Corbató who was a prominent American computer scientist, notable as a pioneer in the development of time-sharing operating systems, then of Massachusetts Institute of Technology. The second recipient, in 1967, was John Backus who was awarded the Mcdowell Award for the development of FORTRAN and the syntactical forms incorporated in ALGOL.  John Backus was the developer of FORTRAN, for years one of the best known and most used programming systems in the world.

W. Wallace McDowell Award recipients

See also

 List of computer-related awards
 List of computer science awards

Notes

Further reading

External links
 

Computer-related awards
IEEE society and council awards
Computer science awards